"All My Friends" is a song by French DJ and record producer Madeon, released on 31 May 2019 as the first single from his sophomore studio album Good Faith. Vinyl copies were released earlier in four cities: Los Angeles and New York City in the United States, Ålesund in Norway, and Nantes in France. Two vinyls were in each location, for a total of eight vinyl copies, released two days before the streaming release of the song.

Charts

Reception 
The website We Rave You opined that "'All My Friends' is a classic Madeon release, carrying his signature melodic synths and drum beats, but has a more poppy, commercial sound this time".

Promotion
After promotional vinyl copies were released in four cities, Leclercq later said that all copies had been found and that the song would be "out everywhere Friday". At midnight on Friday, the song was released with generally good reception from the community.

References

2019 singles
2019 songs
Madeon songs
Song recordings produced by Madeon
Songs written by Madeon
Songs about friendship